A digital marketing engineer is a member of a marketing team who applies web technology and digital marketing platforms (such as a website, email system, CMS, CRM, or other software application) for the purpose of achieving marketing business goals. It is a hybrid role involving both marketing and technology knowledge.  The need for digital marketing engineers arose as a result of marketing becoming reliant on increasingly sophisticated digital technologies.

Role
The digital marketing engineer executes or advises on the execution of, the company's digital strategy. He or she may be either part of the senior marketing management team or operating as a consultant. The digital marketing engineer is responsible for the final architecture, implementation, and management of the digital marketing plan, including advising on using digital technology to improve marketing and business results. As a digital marketing Engineer, he or she has to have a deep knowledge of marketing, social media and the deep knowledge of internet technology and its use. Also a digital marketing engineer is responsible for creating different marketing strategies on different platforms.

See also 
 Digital marketing | Internet marketing | Visual marketing
 Demand generation | Marketing automation | Inbound marketing 
 Conversion optimization
 Web analytics
 Search engine optimization | Social media | Email marketing
 Webmaster 
 Web design
 Web development
 Software engineer | Engineer

References

Website management
Marketing
Digital marketing